Enrico Costa (born 29 November 1969) is an Italian politician and lawyer.

His father Raffaele was a politician as well and has been Minister of Health in the Amato I Cabinet and the Berlusconi I Cabinet.

Biography
In 2004 he was municipal councilor of Forza Italia in Isasca and on 16 May 2005 he was elected regional councilor of Piedmont.

Elected deputy to the Chamber in 2006 on the Forza Italia list in the Piedmont 2 district, he is a member of the Parliamentary Commission for the simplification of legislation.

Re-elected in 2008 in the lists of The People of Freedom, he has been chairman of the PDL in the Justice Commission in the Chamber and a member of the Committee for the Authorizations to proceed at Montecitorio and of the Constitutional Affairs Commission. In the Justice Commission he was speaker for the Government of much discussed rules such as the Lodo Alfano, which blocked the judicial processes against the four highest offices of the State (later repealed by the Constitutional Court), and the so-called Legitimate impediment, which provided for the suspension judicial processes against the Prime Minister and the Ministers up to the maintenance of the elected office.

He was provincial coordinator of the PDL in Cuneo and in January 2013 he was appointed regional coordinator of the PDL in Piedmont.

Re-elected deputy in February 2013 on the PDL list, he became vice president of the Council for the Authorizations to proceed of the Chamber and a member of the Justice Commission.

On 18 November 2013, with the return of the People of Freedom to the name Forza Italia, he joined the New Centre-Right led by Angelino Alfano, being elected Group chairman in the Chamber of Deputies and Regional Coordinator of the party in Piedmont.

On 28 February 2014 he became Deputy Minister of Justice in the Renzi government, thus leaving the position of group leader and being replaced by Nunzia De Girolamo.

In the 2014 Piedmontese regional elections he was a candidate for the presidency of the region for the NCD, just getting 2.98% of the vote.

On 28 January 2016 he became Minister for regional affairs and autonomies, succeeding Maria Carmela Lanzetta (exactly one year after her resignation). In addition to the powers of his department, Prime Minister Renzi entrusted him with responsibilities in matters of family policies. He was reconfirmed as minister with the same powers also in the executive headed by Paolo Gentiloni.

On 19 July 2017 he resigned from his post as minister, in disagreement with some measures proposed by the Council of Ministers to which he was part. On the same day he decided to leave Popular Alternative but Silvio Berlusconi locked the doors of Forza Italia to Costa and other refugees, suggesting that they give life to a new centrist formation.

On 19 December he joined Us with Italy, the so-called "fourth leg" of the center-right coalition, and in the parliamentary elections of 2018 he was re-elected as a deputy in the uninominal constituency of Alba, obtaining 48.24% of the votes.

On 19 April 2018 he left Us with Italy and returned to Forza Italia. On 4 August 2020 he announced his move to Action, the liberal-reformist party founded and led by Carlo Calenda.

References 

1969 births
Living people
People from Cuneo
University of Turin alumni
Members of the Regional Council of Piedmont
Forza Italia politicians
The People of Freedom politicians
New Centre-Right politicians
Popular Alternative politicians
Forza Italia (2013) politicians
Government ministers of Italy
Deputies of Legislature XV of Italy
Deputies of Legislature XVI of Italy
Deputies of Legislature XVII of Italy
Deputies of Legislature XVIII of Italy
Politicians of Piedmont
Renzi Cabinet
20th-century Italian lawyers
21st-century Italian lawyers
20th-century Italian politicians
21st-century Italian politicians